Road to India (also known as Road to India: Between Hell and Nirvana) is an adventure video game released in 2001, that was developed and published by Microïds.

Gameplay
The player assumes the role of an American student named Fred Reynolds, who has travelled to India to find his girlfriend, Anusha, who was kidnapped by thugs. In the game the player has only three days to find the girlfriend, where they visit places such as New Delhi and the Taj Mahal. Each day is broken up into two parts: reality and the dream.

There is around 15 minutes of cinematics in the game, which uses the Virtools engine.

Plot

Development

Reception 

Scott Osborne of GameSpot gave the game a 7.0 "Good" rating and said "Road to India is a fine example of old-school adventure gaming with a modern presentation." Tamara Schembri of GameSpy thought the game was imaginative and stylish, albeit not perfect. Staci Krause of IGN wrote that while the game was entertaining, it was too short for the experience to be wholly recommendable.

Road to India was a nominee for GameSpot's 2001 "Best Adventure Game" and The Electric Playgrounds 2001 "Best Adventure Game for PC" awards, but lost both prizes to Myst III: Exile.

References

External links 
 Road to India at Microïds 
 

2001 video games
Adventure games
Microïds games
Video games developed in France
Windows games
Windows-only games